Kotel Gap (Kotelska Sedlovina \'ko-tel-ska se-dlo-vi-'na\) is a saddle of elevation 660 m extending 1 km between Serdica Peak and Silistra Knoll in Levski Ridge, Tangra Mountains on Livingston Island in the South Shetland Islands, Antarctica. The saddle is part of the divide between the glacial catchments of Macy Glacier to the north and Boyana Glacier to the south.  It was named after the Bulgarian town of Kotel.

Location

Maps
 L.L. Ivanov et al. Antarctica: Livingston Island and Greenwich Island, South Shetland Islands. Scale 1:100000 topographic map. Sofia: Antarctic Place-names Commission of Bulgaria, 2005.
 L.L. Ivanov. Antarctica: Livingston Island and Greenwich, Robert, Snow and Smith Islands. Scale 1:120000 topographic map.  Troyan: Manfred Wörner Foundation, 2009.

References
 Kotel Gap. SCAR [Composite Antarctic Gazetteer]]
 Bulgarian Antarctic Gazetteer. Antarctic Place-names Commission. (details in Bulgarian, basic data in English)

External links
 Kotel Gap. Copernix satellite image

Tangra Mountains